Salih Yoluç (born 22 August 1985, Istanbul) is a Turkish racing driver.

Biography
Salih started his racing career in 2015 with Optimum Motorsport, and won Dubai 24 Hour in his first-ever year of competing.

At the end of 2015, he made a move to his current team, TF Sport, and competed in the 2016 GT3 Le Mans Cup, where he won the teams championship and also finished second in the drivers' standings with 2 wins and 5 podiums in 6 races. He also competed in International GT Open championship the same year and got 2 wins and 3 podiums in 12 races.

2017 was a turnaround year in Salih's career, as he became the first-ever Turkish driver to compete in 24 Hours of Le Mans. He finished 7th in class.

The same year, he also competed in European Le Mans Series and finished second in the standings with 1 win and 5 podiums out of 6 races.

In 2018, he started racing in FIA World Endurance Championship and finished 3rd in the standings at the end of the season with 4 podiums and 1 pole position out of 8 races. He had a DNF and a P11 in the 2018 and 2019 24 Hours of Le Mans races.

In 2019, he raced in the Blancpain GT Series and won the Pro/Am Cup championship with 1 win, 5 podiums and 3 pole positions out of 6 races, including a win at the Total 24 hours of SPA.

The long 2019-2020 season was the biggest turning point in Salih's career. On 20 September 2020, he became the first and only Turkish driver to ever win the 24 Hours of Le Mans. The same season, he finished 2nd and became the vice-champions in the FIA World Endurance Championship standings with 4 wins, 5 podiums, and 2 pole positions out of 8 races.

In 2021, he raced for the European Le Mans Series LMP2 debut of TF Sport, Racing Team Turkey, with teammates Charlie Eastwood and Harry Tincknell.

In 2022, Salih won the European Le Mans Series LMP2 Pro/Am title with his newly established team, Racing Team Turkey, with 4 wins, 5 podiums and 1 pole position out of 6 races.

In 2023, Salih won the Asian Le Mans Series LMP2 (Overall) title with DKR Engineering from Luxembourg with 1 win, 4 podiums out of 4 races.

Racing record

Career summary

24 Hours of Le Mans results

Complete FIA World Endurance Championship results
(key) (Races in bold indicate pole position; races in italics indicate fastest lap)

Complete European Le Mans Series results
(key) (Races in bold indicate pole position; results in italics indicate fastest lap)

Complete Asian Le Mans Series results

Complete Formula Regional Asian Championship results 
(key) (Races in bold indicate pole position) (Races in italics indicate the fastest lap of top ten finishers)

References

External links

 Official Website
 Salih Yoluc at TF Sport
 Salih Yoluc at gt3me.com
 Salih Yoluc at fiawec.com 
 Salih Yoluc at total24hours.com
 Salih Yoluc career statistics at Driver Database

Living people
1985 births
Sportspeople from Istanbul
Turkish racing drivers
24 Hours of Daytona drivers
24 Hours of Le Mans drivers
FIA World Endurance Championship drivers
British GT Championship drivers
International GT Open drivers
Blancpain Endurance Series drivers
European Le Mans Series drivers
Asian Le Mans Series drivers
WeatherTech SportsCar Championship drivers
Formula Regional Asian Championship drivers
Porsche Carrera Cup GB drivers
Walter Lechner Racing drivers
Pinnacle Motorsport drivers
United Autosports drivers
FIA Motorsport Games drivers
Eurasia Motorsport drivers
Aston Martin Racing drivers
24H Series drivers
Le Mans Cup drivers
GT4 European Series drivers